Satyadev Kancharana is an Indian actor who primarily works in Telugu cinema. He is known for the movies Jyothi Lakshmi (2015), Kshanam (2016), Mana Oori Ramayanam (2016), Bluff Master (2018), Brochevarevarura (2019), and Uma Maheswara Ugra Roopasya (2020).

Early life  
Satyadev hails from Visakhapatnam. He attended SFS School and Nalanda Talent School in Visakhapatnam. He later graduated in Computer Science Engineering from MVGR College of Engineering, Vijayanagaram. He worked as Virtual Design Architect for IBM and VMware till 2016, post which he quit to focus solely on his film career.

Satyadev is married to Deepika. The couple has a son born in 2020.

Career 

Satyadev started his career with short films. His first appearance in a feature film was Mr. Perfect (2011). He then continued to do minor roles in films like Seethamma Vakitlo Sirimalle Chettu and Mukunda. Satydev's first film in a noticeable role was Maine Pyar Kiya. Although the film received limited response, a critic from the Deccan Chronicle wrote that "Another promising debutant is Satya Dev, who had to perform two characters — one young and the other, in the 40s. The variations in both characters are brought out superbly by Dev". 

Satyadev was selected from over 500 artistes who auditioned for the lead role in Jyothi Lakshmi. The film, although a moderate box office success, provided him a much needed recognition in the film industry and after that he got an opportunity to work with Prakash Raj in Mana Oori Ramayanam. He also acted in The Ghazi Attack. He was featured in the music video "Daare Leda" alongside Roopa Kodavayur. It is performed by Roshan Sebastian, composed by Vijay Bulganin, written by KK and produced by Nani.

Filmography

Films

All films are in Telugu, unless otherwise noted.

As an actor

As a dubbing artist

Television

References

External links 

Male actors from Visakhapatnam
Indian male film actors
Living people
21st-century Indian male actors
Male actors in Telugu cinema
IBM employees
1989 births
Telugu male actors
Telugu playback singers
Indian male playback singers
Male actors in Hindi cinema
Male actors in Kannada cinema